N.K. Sharma is an Indian theatre director and acting teacher. Since 1978 he has been freelance theatre person, working all over India in many languages and with many traditional forms. Sharma has worked with Safdar Hashmi.

Early life and career 
He began his theatre career with the Jana Natya Manch (Janam)- to be in  association with Communist Party of India (Marxist), he was in government sector where any employee were not allow to participate in any political activities. After years with 'Janam' He founded a theatre group 'Act One' in 1990 with Manoj Bajpayiee.

“You must be interested in people if you want stories. Shakespeare lived before Marx, but he wrote working class stories. The Panchatantra was all about the triumph of good over evil and the desire to live. Stories are going to come back. Look at (Steven) Spielberg’s last four films. The spotlight will return to the actor,” - He told to The Hindu.

Notable students 
 Manoj Bajpayiee
 Deepak Dobriyal
 Huma Qureshi
 Ashish Vidyarthi
 Piyush Mishra
 Darshan Kumar
 Shoojit Sircar
 Dino Morea

External links 
 Guftagoo with N K Sharma on Rajya Sabha TV

References 

Living people
Indian theatre directors
Hindi theatre
Year of birth missing (living people)